Still Bill is a 2009 documentary film about musician Bill Withers. It received its world premiere at the 2009 South by Southwest Film Festival.  The title is a reference to Withers' 1972 album of the same name.

Premise
The film follows the life of Bill Withers, from his roots in West Virginia to his career in the United States Navy, to his famed musical career and post-retirement family life.

Cast
 Bill Withers
 Jim Brown
 Cornell Dupree 
 James Gadson
 Jim James
 Angélique Kidjo
 Ralph MacDonald
 Raul Midón
 Bill Russell
 Tavis Smiley
 Sting
 Cornel West

Critical reception
The film received mostly positive reviews. On Metacritic the film has a score of a 76 out of 100 based on reviews from 5 critics, indicating "generally positive reviews." On Rotten Tomatoes the film has an approval rating of 100% based on reviews from 6 critics.

Roger Ebert of the Chicago Sun-Times gave the film 3 out of 4 stars and wrote positively about the film except for one set-up interview with Cornel West and Tavis Smiley:

Mike Hale of The New York Times also thought the film was well done and mirrored Ebert's position on the interview with West and Smiley:

References

External links 
 
 

2009 films
Documentary films about music and musicians
Films shot in Los Angeles
Films shot in New York City
Films shot in West Virginia
2009 documentary films
Documentary films about African Americans
American documentary films
Bill Withers
2000s English-language films
2000s American films